The women's taijiquan competition at the 1998 Asian Games in Bangkok, Thailand was held on 18 December at Thammasat University.

Schedule

Results 
Only the top-seven scores have been preserved.

References 

Women's_taijiquan